Lunas Rotas is the debut album of Spanish singer and composer Rosana Arbelo.

The title track and the song "El Talismán" were used in the soundtrack of the 1996 movie Curdled. Billboard noted: "An accomplished pianist and guitarist, Rosana Arbelo's extraordinary voice gives Lunas Rotas an intimate quality. […] flamenco-pop sisters Azúcar Moreno are among those who have recorded her songs, and like that of Azúcar Moreno, Arbelo's music has a distinct Caribbean and Latin influence".

As of September 2016, Lunas Rotas was ranked joint 7th in the list of best-selling albums in Spain; it had certified physical sales of 1,100,000 according to Productores de Música de España (PROMUSICAE).

Track listing
All songs written by Rosana Arbelo

Personnel
(Alphabetical order)
''Per sleeve notes

 Rosana Arbelo: Lead vocals; Backing vocals (tracks 1, 2, 3, 6, 7, 8, 9, 11); Spanish guitar (tracks 6, 10, 11, 12)
 Paco Bastante: Bass guitar (tracks: 1 to 5, 7, 9 to 11)
 Sergio Castillo: Backing vocals (tracks 1, 2); Drums (tracks 1 to 5, 7 to 11); Shaker (track 8)
 Tino Di Geraldo: Cajón (track 8)
 Carlos Domenech: Backing vocals (tracks 1, 2, 9, 10)
 Luis Dulzaides: Percussion (tracks 1 to 5, 7 to 10)
 Alba Fresno: Viol (track 9)
 Antonio García De Diego: Backing vocals (track 2); Keyboards (track 3)
 Cristina Gonzalez: Backing vocals (tracks 1, 2)
 Tato Icasto: Electric piano (tracks 3, 10); Keyboards (track 4); Wurlitzer organ (track 10)
 Fernando Illan: Bass guitar (track 8)
 Juan Maya: Flamenco guitar (track 8
 Jesus Ortiz: Backing vocals (track 7)
 Kike Perdomo: Saxophones (track 7)
 José A. Morero: 12-string guitar (tracks 2, 12); Acoustic guitar (tracks: 1 to 4, 6, 9, 11); Electric guitar (tracks 1 to 10, 12); Spanish guitar (tracks 5, 7, 9); Mandolin (track 2); electric piano (track 2); Keyboards (tracks 5, 7, 8, 9, 11); piano (track 9)

Production personnel
(Alphabetical order)
 Miguel De La Vega: Mixing;
 Iñaki Del Olmo: Mixing assistant
 Carlos Martos: Mastering
 Lola Román: Mixing assistant
 José A. Morero: Mixing; Producer

Certifications

See also
 List of number-one albums of 1996 (Spain)
 List of best-selling Latin albums

References

External links
 Lunas Rotas at Discogs

1996 debut albums
Rosana Arbelo albums